The second season (2015–2016) of the Turkish TV series, Diriliş: Ertuğrul, created by Mehmet Bozdağ succeeds the first season and precedes the third season of Diriliş: Ertuğrul.

Plot 
The Kayı settled in Erzerum, seek refuge with Dodurga, after the mongols, led by Baycu Noyan, massacre half their tribe. This leads to Ertuğrul facing Tuğtekin who is jealous of him all along. Gündöğdü is misled by a threat within Dodurga; Aytolun and Gümüştekin. Ayotlun married Tuğtekin's father, Korkut Bey, so that she could help his brother, Gümüştekin become the margrave of all Turkmen tribes(Üç Bey), with the helf of Emir Sadettin Köpek. After killing Korkut, only Selcan is aware of this threat and constantly tries to warn Gündöğdü, who ignores her for her misdeeds in past. Along with these schemes, Kocabaş, Tuğtekin's alp who works for Baycu Noyan, turns Tuğtekin against Ertuğrul, making their relationship worse but is later killed by Ertuğrul and his relationship with Tuğtekin gradually improves. Aytolun and Gümüştekin are killed after their treachery is caught. After killing Tuğtekin, Noyan is supposedly killed by Ertuğrul, and the tribe split between 1000 migrating to Ahlat with Gündöğdü, and 400 migrating to Western Anatolia with Ertuğrul.

Production
Season 2 was based around the current events happening in the year at the time. Metin Günay, the director, said,

Reception
Even the season's trailers became a great hit in Turkey, with a record-breaking hit, the season teaser, trailer, and internet promotion reached more than 10 million people over the internet in three days and received close to 3 million clicks. Thousands of positive comments also came to the series via social media.

Cast

Main characters 
 Engin Altan Düzyatan as Ertuğrul Bey
 Uğur Güneş as Tuğtekin Bey
 Hülya Darcan as Hayme Ana
 Esra Bilgiç as Halime Sultan
 Barış Bağcı as Baycu Noyan
 Cengiz Coşkun as Turgut Alp
 Cavit Çetin Güner as Doğan Alp
 Didem Balçın as Selcan Hatun
 Kaan Taşaner as Gündoğdu Bey

Supporting characters 
 Hüseyin Özay as Korkut Bey
 Ezgi Esma as Banu Çiçek
 Nurettin Sönmez as Bamsı Beyrek
  as Sadettin Köpek
 Ayberk Pekcan as Artuk Bey
 Ozman Sirgood as İbn-i Arabi
 Celal Al as Abdurrhahman Alp
 Burcu Kıratlı as Gökçe Hatun
  as Aytolun Hatun
 Zeynep Kızıltan as Goncagül Hatun
  as Sungurtekin Bey
  as Deli Demir
  as Gümüştekin Bey

Minor characters
 Edip Zeydan as Dumrul Alp
 Gökhan Öskay as Kaya Alp
 Melih Özdoğan as Samsa Alp
 Kaptan Gürman as Geyikli
 Gökhan Karacık as Derviş İshak
 Atilla Kılıç as Boğaç Alp
  as Ulu Bilge Şaman
 Hakan Serim as Günkut Alp
 Melikşah Özen as Melikşah Alp
 Bogaçhan Talha Peker as Turalı Alp
 Muharrem Özcan as Tangut
 Tolga Sala as Hamza Alp
  as Kocabaş Alp

Guest characters 
 Serdar Gökhan as Süleyman Şah
 * Hande Subaşı as Aykız Hatun
 Even Sakcı as Efrasiyab
 Onur Şenay as Atabey Ertokuş
 Sedat Kalkavan as Karabek
 Arda Anarat as Dündar Bey
 Burak Temiz as Yiğit Alp

Episodes

References

External links 
 

Diriliş: Ertuğrul and Kuruluş: Osman
2015 television seasons